David Andrew Freedman (born 19 June 1964) was an Australian first-class cricketer who played for the New South Wales. He represented an Australia 'A' side in 1992-93.

Freedman was a left arm leg spin bowler and played in two Sheffield Shield Final teams for NSW. He once took a match haul of 11/93 against the West Indies in 1995-96.

External links
 
 David Freedman- Interview  at Cricket NSW

1964 births
Living people
New South Wales cricketers